T. microstomus may refer to:

Trachydoras microstomus, a thorny catfish species
Typhlops microstomus, a snake species

See also
Microstomus